Asara Rural District is in Asara District of Karaj County, Alborz province, Iran. At the census of 2006, its population was 3,780 in 1,109 households, and in the most recent census of 2016, it had decreased to 3,063 in 1,101 households. The largest of its 11 villages was Shahrestanak, with 1,307 people.

References 

Rural Districts of Alborz Province

Populated places in Alborz Province

Populated places in Karaj County